Kristoffer Chaka Bwanausi Tømmerbakke (born June 23, 1983). better known by his stage name Kriss, is a Norwegian producer, songwriter and rapper. He got his break as half of the rap duo Erik & Kriss in 2007, one of he most successful Norwegian artists over the past decade. Tømmerbakke has since written and produced eight Top10 singles in Norway as part of the group.

Kriss took his first steps internationally with a Swedish Spotify #1 with the artist Kamferdrops in 2017, and saw his international stock rise with his work on Robin Schulz feat Alida “In Your Eyes” that hit #1 on Billboard Dance. The track was also at the Global 100 on Spotify (peaking at #86th), and reaching Top10 in Germany, Austria and Switzerland. 

Kriss followed up working with R3HAB, Alok (DJ), W&W, Lucas & Steve, Kriss has also produced, written for and collaborated with Moti, Mohombi, Brooks, LVNDSCAPE, Felix Cartal and Broiler. Tømmerbakke works closely with producer/writer Erik Smaaland in the production duo GoToGuy.

Tømmerbakke has also worked with K-pop group Twice, on their EP Taste of Love (EP), which reached #6 on the Billboard Top 200, and #2 in the Korean Album Charts.

References 

1983 births
Living people
Musicians from Bærum